Ecublens may refer to:

 Écublens, Fribourg, a municipality in the canton of Fribourg, Switzerland
 Écublens, Vaud, a municipality in the canton of Vaud, Switzerland